Microsoft Bookings is a scheduling tool and is part of the Microsoft Office family of products. Released by Microsoft in March 2017, Bookings allows customers of small businesses and companies to book appointments with the company. The application is available to Business Premium subscribers to Office 365 and offers integration with Microsoft Teams and the outgoing Skype for Business, however, this feature was not available from launch.

History 
On July 20, 2016, Microsoft launched Bookings to customers in the U.S. and Canada with an Office 365 Business Premium license. On March 20, 2017, Microsoft globally released Bookings worldwide including launching Bookings for Android and iOS.

References 

Microsoft
Microsoft Office
Cloud applications